Hruszowice  is a village in Gmina Stubno, within Przemyśl County, Subcarpathian Voivodeship, in southeastern Poland, near the border with Ukraine.

References

Hruszowice